Martin Formanack (December 1, 1866 – November 1, 1947) was an American rower who competed in the 1904 Summer Olympics.

He was born in a part of Germany and died in St. Louis, Missouri. In 1904 he was part of the American boat, which won the silver medal in the coxless four.

References

External links
 profile 

1866 births
1947 deaths
Rowers at the 1904 Summer Olympics
Olympic silver medalists for the United States in rowing
American male rowers
Medalists at the 1904 Summer Olympics